Anaitz Arbilla Zabala (born 15 May 1987) is a Spanish professional footballer who plays for SD Eibar as a full-back or a central defender.

Club career
Born in Pamplona, Navarre, Arbilla began his senior career in 2004 with CD Basconia, Athletic Bilbao's farm team. Two years later he progressed to the reserves in the Segunda División B and, after two seasons, signed with another club in the Basque Country and that level, Barakaldo CF.

Arbilla moved to Polideportivo Ejido (also in division three) for the 2009–10 campaign. The following year he had his first experience in the Segunda División, joining UD Salamanca and starting in 29 league games as the Castile and León team eventually suffered relegation.

In late August 2011, Arbilla moved to another side in the second division, Hércules CF, for a €200,000 fee. He reached La Liga in January 2013, after arriving as a free agent at Rayo Vallecano.

Arbilla made his debut in the Spanish top flight on 10 February 2013, playing the full 90 minutes in a 2–1 home win against Atlético Madrid. He started in eight of his 11 appearances as the Madrid outskirts club eventually retained its league status.

Arbilla scored his first goal for Rayo and in the top tier on 8 February 2014, his team's second in the 4–1 victory over Málaga CF also at Campo de Fútbol de Vallecas. On 30 August 2016, he signed a three-year deal with SD Eibar of the same league.

References

External links

1987 births
Living people
Spanish footballers
Footballers from Pamplona
Association football defenders
Association football utility players
La Liga players
Segunda División players
Segunda División B players
Tercera División players
CD Basconia footballers
Bilbao Athletic footballers
Athletic Bilbao footballers
Barakaldo CF footballers
Polideportivo Ejido footballers
UD Salamanca players
Hércules CF players
Rayo Vallecano players
RCD Espanyol footballers
SD Eibar footballers
Basque Country international footballers